Race and ethnicity in the United States census, defined by the federal Office of Management and Budget (OMB) and the United States Census Bureau, are the self-identified categories of race or races and ethnicity chosen by residents, with which they most closely identify, and indicate whether they are of Hispanic or Latino origin (the only categories for ethnicity).

The racial categories represent a social-political construct for the race or races that respondents consider themselves to be and, "generally reflect a social definition of race recognized in this country." OMB defines the concept of race as outlined for the U.S. census as not "scientific or anthropological" and takes into account "social and cultural characteristics as well as ancestry", using "appropriate scientific methodologies" that are not "primarily biological or genetic in reference." The race categories include both racial and national-origin groups.

Race and ethnicity are considered separate and distinct identities, with Hispanic or Latino origin asked as a separate question. Thus, in addition to their race or races, all respondents are categorized by membership in one of two ethnic categories, which are "Hispanic or Latino" and "Not Hispanic or Latino". However, the practice of separating "race" and "ethnicity" as different categories has been criticized both by the American Anthropological Association and members of U.S. Commission on Civil Rights.

In 1997, OMB issued a Federal Register notice regarding revisions to the standards for the classification of federal data on race and ethnicity. OMB developed race and ethnic standards in order to provide "consistent data on race and ethnicity throughout the federal government. The development of the data standards stem in large measure from new responsibilities to enforce civil rights laws." Among the changes, OMB issued the instruction to "mark one or more races" after noting evidence of increasing numbers of interracial children and wanting to capture the diversity in a measurable way and having received requests by people who wanted to be able to acknowledge their or their children's full ancestry rather than identifying with only one group. Prior to this decision, the census and other government data collections asked people to report only one race.

How data on race and ethnicity are used
The OMB states, "many federal programs are put into effect based on the race data obtained from the decennial census (i.e., promoting equal employment opportunities; assessing racial disparities in health and environmental risks). Race data are also critical for the basic research behind many policy decisions. States require these data to meet legislative redistricting requirements. The data are needed to monitor compliance with the Voting Rights Act by local jurisdictions".

"Data on ethnic groups are important for putting into effect a number of federal statutes (i.e., enforcing bilingual election rules under the Voting Rights Act; monitoring and enforcing equal employment opportunities under the Civil Rights Act). Data on Ethnic Groups are also needed by local governments to run programs and meet legislative requirements (i.e., identifying segments of the population who may not be receiving medical services under the Public Health Act; evaluating whether financial institutions are meeting the credit needs of minority populations under the Community Reinvestment Act)."

Brief overview of race and ethnicity in U.S. census history

18th and 19th centuries

1790 census

The 1790 United States census was the first census in the history of the United States. The population of the United States was recorded as 3,929,214 as of Census Day, August 2, 1790, as mandated by Article I, Section 2 of the United States Constitution and applicable laws.

"The law required that every household be visited, that completed census schedules be posted in two of the most public places within each jurisdiction, there to remain for the inspection of all concerned, and that 'the aggregate amount of each description of persons' for every district be transmitted to the president." This law along with U.S. marshals were responsible for governing the census.

Loss of data
About one-third of the original census data has been lost or destroyed since documentation. The data was lost in 1790–1830, and included data from Connecticut, Maine, Maryland, Massachusetts, New Hampshire, New York, North Carolina, Pennsylvania, Rhode Island, South Carolina, Vermont, Delaware, Georgia, New Jersey, and Virginia. However, the census was proven factual and the existence of most of this data can be confirmed in many secondary sources pertaining to the first census.

Data
Census data included the name of the head of the family and categorized inhabitants as: free white males at least 16 years of age (to assess the country's industrial and military potential), free white males under 16 years of age, free white females, all other free persons (reported by sex and color), and slaves. Thomas Jefferson, then the Secretary of State,  directed marshals to collect data from all 13 states (Connecticut, Delaware, Georgia, Maryland, Massachusetts, New Hampshire, New Jersey, New York, North Carolina, Pennsylvania, Rhode Island, South Carolina, and Virginia), and from the Southwest Territory. The census was not conducted in Vermont until 1791, after that state's admission to the Union as the 14th state on March 4 of that year.

Contemporary perception

Some doubt surrounded the numbers, as President George Washington and Thomas Jefferson maintained the population was undercounted. The potential reasons Washington and Jefferson may have thought this could be refusal to participate, poor public transportation and roads, spread-out population, and restraints of current technology.

Data availability
No microdata from the 1790 population census are available, but aggregate data for small areas and their compatible cartographic boundary files, can be downloaded from the National Historical Geographic Information System. However, the categories of "Free white males" of 16 years and upward, including heads of families under 16 years, "Free white females", including heads of families, All other free persons, and "Slaves," existed in the census form.

1800 and 1810 census
In 1800 and 1810, the age question regarding free white males was more detailed with five cohorts and included All other free persons, except "Indians not taxed", and "Slaves.".

1820 census
The 1820 census built on the questions asked in 1810 by asking age questions about slaves. Also the term "colored" entered the census nomenclature. In addition, a question stating "Number of foreigners not naturalized" was included.

1830 census
In the 1830 census, a new question, which stated, "The number of White persons who were foreigners not naturalized" was included.

1850 census
The 1850 census had a dramatic shift in the way information about residents was collected. For the first time, free persons were listed individually instead of by head of household. Two questionnaires were used - one for free inhabitants and one for slaves. The question on the free inhabitants schedule about color was a column that was to be left blank if a person were white, marked "B" if a person were black, and marked "M" if a person were mulatto. Slaves were listed by owner, and classified by gender and age, not individually, and the question about color was a column that was to be marked with a "B" if the slave were black and an "M" if mulatto.

1890 census
For 1890, the Census Office changed the design of the population questionnaire. Residents were still listed individually, but a new questionnaire sheet was used for each family. Additionally, this was the first year that the census distinguished among different Asian ethnic groups, such as Japanese and Chinese, due to increased immigration. This census also marked the beginning of the term "race" in the questionnaires. Enumerators were instructed to write "White", "Black", "Mulatto", "Quadroon", "Octoroon", "Chinese", "Japanese", or "Indian".

1900 census
During 1900, the "Color or Race" question was slightly modified, removing the term "Mulatto". Also, there was an inclusion of an "Indian Population Schedule" in which "enumerators were instructed to use a special expanded questionnaire for American Indians living on reservations or in family groups off of reservations." This expanded version included the question "Fraction of person's lineage that is white."

20th century

1910 census
The 1910 census was similar to that of 1900, but it included a reinsertion of "Mulatto" and a question about the  "mother tongue" of foreign-born individuals and individuals with foreign-born parents. "Ot" was also added to signify "other races", with space for a race to be written in. This decade's version of the Indian Population Schedule featured questions asking the individual's proportion of white, black, or American Indian lineage.

1920 census
The 1920 census questionnaire was similar to 1910, but excluded a separate schedule for Indigenous Americas. "Hin", "Kor", and "Fil" were also added to the "Color or Race" question, signifying Hindustani (South Asia Indian), Korean, and Filipino, respectively.

1930 census
 The biggest change in this census was in racial classification. Enumerators were instructed to no longer use the "Mulatto" classification. Instead, they were given special instructions for reporting the race of interracial persons. A person with both white and black ancestry (termed "blood") was to be recorded as "Negro", no matter the fraction of that lineage (the "one-drop rule"). A person of mixed black and American Indian ancestry was also to be recorded as "Neg" (for "Negro") unless they were considered to be "predominantly" American Indian and accepted as such within the community. A person with both white and American Indian ancestry was to be recorded as American Indian, unless their Indigenous ancestry was small, and they were accepted as white within the community. In all situations in which a person had white and some other racial ancestry, they were to be reported as that other race. People who had minority interracial ancestry were to be reported as the race of their father.

For the first and only time, "Mexican" was listed as a race. Enumerators were instructed that all people born in Mexico, or whose parents were born in Mexico, should be listed as Mexicans, and not under any other racial category. In prior censuses and in 1940, enumerators were instructed to list Mexican Americans as white, perhaps because some of them were of white background (mainly Spanish), many others mixed white and Native American and some of them Native American.

The Supplemental American Indian questionnaire was back, but in abbreviated form. It featured a question asking if the person was of full or mixed American Indian ancestry.

1940 census
President Franklin D. Roosevelt promoted a "good neighbor" policy that sought better relations with Mexico. In 1935, a federal judge ruled that three Mexican immigrants were ineligible for citizenship because they were not white, as required by federal law. Mexico protested, and Roosevelt decided to circumvent the decision and make sure the federal government treated Hispanics as white. The State Department, the Census Bureau, the Labor Department, and other government agencies therefore made sure to uniformly classify people of Mexican descent as white. This policy encouraged the League of United Latin American Citizens in its quest to minimize discrimination by asserting their whiteness.

The 1940 census was the first to include separate population and housing questionnaires. The race category of "Mexican" was eliminated in 1940, and the population of Mexican descent was counted with the white population.

1940 census data was used for Japanese American internment. The Census Bureau's role was denied for decades, but was finally proven in 2007.

1950 census
The 1950 census questionnaire removed the word "color" from the racial question, and also removed Hindu and Korean from the race choices.

1960 census
The 1960 census re-added the word "color" to the racial question, and changed "Indian" to "American Indian", as well as adding Hawaiian, Part-Hawaiian, Aleut, and Eskimo. The "Other (print out race)" option was removed.

1970 census
This year's census included "Negro or Black", re-added Korean and the Other race option. East Indians (the term used at that time for people whose ancestry is from the Indian subcontinent) were counted as White. There was a questionnaire that was asked of only a sample of respondents. These questions were as follows:

 a. Where was this person born?
 b. Is this person's origin or descent...
 # Mexican
 Puerto Rican
 Cuban
 Central or South American
 Other Spanish
 None of These
 What country was the person's father born in?
 What country was the person's mother born in?
 a. For persons born in a foreign country – Is the person naturalized?
b When did the person come to the United States to stay?
 What language, other than English, was spoken in the person's home as a child?
Spanish
French
Italian
German
Other
None, only EnglishQuestions on Spanish or Hispanic Origin or Descent 

Is this person's origin or descent?

Mexican

Puerto Rican Cuban

Central American Other Spanish

No, none of these

1980 census
This year added several options to the race question, including Vietnamese, Indian (East), Guamanian, Samoan, and re-added Aleut. Again, the term "color" was removed from the racial question, and the following questions were asked of a sample of respondents:

 In what state or foreign country was the person born?
 If this person was born in a foreign country...
a. Is this person a naturalized citizen of the United States?
b. When did this person come to the United States to stay?
 a. Does this person speak a language other than English at home?
b. If yes, what is this language?
c. If yes, how well does this person speak English?
 What is this person's ancestry?  Questions on Spanish or Hispanic Origin or Descent 

Is this person of Spanish/Hispanic origin or descent?

No, not Spanish/Hispanic

Yes, Mexican, Mexican American, Chicano Yes, Puerto Rican

Yes, Cuban

Yes, other Spanish/Hispanic

1990 census
The racial categories in this year are as they appear in the 2000 and 2010 censuses. The following questions were asked of a sample of respondents for the 1990 census:

 In what U.S. State or foreign country was this person born?
 Is this person a citizen of the United States?
 If this person was not born in the United States, when did this person come to the United States to stay?
The 1990 census was not designed to capture multiple racial responses, and when individuals marked the "other" race option and provided a multiple write-in. The response was assigned according to the race written first. "For example, a write-in of 'black-white' was assigned a code of 'black,' while a write-in of 'white-black' was assigned a code of 'white.'"

Questions on Spanish or Hispanic Origin or Descent 

Is this person of Spanish/Hispanic origin?

No, not Spanish/Hispanic

Yes, Mexican, Mexican American, Chicano

Yes, Puerto Rican

Yes, Cuban

Yes, other Spanish/Hispanic, print one group ...Census data indicate that the number of children in interracial families grew from less than one-half million in 1970 to about two million in 1990. In 1990, for interracial families with one White partner, the other parent was Black for about 20 percent of all children, the other parent was Asian for 45 percent, and the other parent was American Indian and Alaska Native for about 34 percent.

2000 census
Race was asked differently in the 2000 census in several other ways than previously. Most significantly, respondents were given the option of selecting one or more race categories to indicate racial identities. Data show that nearly seven million Americans identified as members of two or more races. Because of these changes, the 2000 census data on race are not directly comparable with data from the 1990 census or earlier censuses. Use of caution is therefore recommended when interpreting changes in the racial composition of the U.S. population over time.

The following definitions apply to the 2000 census only.
 White — A person having origins in any of the original peoples of Europe, the Middle East, or North Africa. It includes people who indicate their race as "white-skinned people" or report entries such as Irish, German, English, Scandinavian, Scottish, Near Easterners, Iranian, Lebanese, or Polish.
 Black or African American — A person having origins in any of the black racial groups of Africa. It includes people who indicate their race as "Black, African Am." or provide written entries such as Kenyan, Nigerian, or Haitian.
 American Indian and Alaska Native — A person having origins in any of the original peoples of North and South America (including Central America) and who maintain tribal affiliation or community attachment.
 Asian — A person having origins in any of the original peoples of the Far East, Southeast Asia, or the Indian subcontinent including, for example, Cambodia, China, India, Indonesia, Japan, Korea, Malaysia, Pakistan, the Philippine Islands, Thailand, and Vietnam. It includes "Asian Indian", "Chinese", "Filipino", "Korean", "Japanese", "Vietnamese", and "Other Asian".
 Native Hawaiian and Other Pacific Islander — A person having origins in any of the original peoples of Hawaii, Guam, Samoa, or other Pacific Islands. It includes people who indicate their race as "Native Hawaiian", "Guamanian or Chamorro", "Samoan", and "Other Pacific Islander".
 Some other race — Includes all other responses not included in the "Caucasian", "Black or African American", "American Indian and Alaska Native", "Asian" and "Native Hawaiian and Other Pacific Islander" race categories described above. Respondents providing write-in entries such as multiracial, mixed, interracial, We-Sort, or a Hispanic/Latino group (for example, Mexican, Puerto Rican, or Cuban) in the "Some other race" category are included here.
 Two or more races — People may have chosen to provide two or more races either by checking two or more race response check boxes, by providing multiple write-in responses, or by some combination of check boxes and write-in responses.

The federal government of the United States has mandated that "in data collection and presentation, federal agencies are required to use a minimum of two ethnicities: "Hispanic or Latino" and "Not Hispanic or Latino". The Census Bureau defines "Hispanic or Latino" as "a person of Cuban, Mexican, Puerto Rican, South or Central American or other Spanish culture or origin regardless of race."

Use of the word "ethnicity" for Hispanics only is considerably more restricted than its conventional meaning, which covers other distinctions, some of which are covered by the "race" and "ancestry" questions. The distinct questions accommodate the possibility of Hispanic and Latino Americans' also declaring various racial identities (see also White Hispanic and Latino Americans, Asian Hispanic and Latino Americans, and Black Hispanic and Latino Americans).

In the 2000 census, 12.5% of the U.S. population reported "Hispanic or Latino" ethnicity and 87.5% reported "Not-Hispanic or Latino" ethnicity.

21st century

2010 census
The 2010 census included changes designed to more clearly distinguish Hispanic ethnicity as not being a race. That included adding the sentence: "For this census, Hispanic origins are not races." Additionally, the Hispanic terms were modified from "Hispanic or Latino" to "Hispanic, Latino or Spanish origin".

Although used in the census and the American Community Survey, "Some other race" is not an official race, and the Bureau considered eliminating it prior to the 2000 census. As the 2010 census form did not contain the question titled "Ancestry" found in prior censuses, there were campaigns to get non-Hispanic West Indian Americans, Turkish Americans, Armenian Americans, Arab Americans, and Iranian Americans to indicate their ethnic or national background through the race question, specifically the "Some other race" category.

The Interagency Committee has suggested that the concept of marking multiple boxes be extended to the Hispanic origin question, thereby freeing individuals from having to choose between their parents' ethnic heritages. In other words, a respondent could choose both "Hispanic or Latino" and "Not Hispanic or Latino".

2020 census 
The 2020 census featured similar designs to the 2000 and 2010 censuses. Subsequently, the Census Bureau adhered to the 1997 OMB standards and thus used two separate questions to collect data on race and ethnicity. However, there were improvements in the phrasing of the race and ethnicity questions within the OMB guidelines, that would enhance clarity for respondents.

The Hispanic origin question included the same checkboxes as the 2010 census ("Mexican, Mexican Am., Chicano", "Puerto Rican", "Cuban"), along with a "Yes, another Hispanic, Latino, or Spanish origin". Under this category, two changes emerged. The first was the shift from "Print origin, for example" to "Print, for example". The removal of the word origin was due to the surveyed confusion and differentiating meanings origin has for respondents or varying backgrounds. Furthermore, the Census Bureau updated the write-in instructions for the "Some Other Race" category and included the instruction to "Print race", but changed the instruction to read "Print race or origin" to match the primary instruction to "Mark ☒ one or more boxes AND print origins".

According to the United States Census Bureau, as a result of significant feedback, a detailed write-in response and example were included for the "White" and the "Black or African Am." racial categories to compensate a wider horizon of identities. There were also six example groups for each of the "White", "Black or African American", and "American Indian or Alaska Native" racial categories. In addition, after 100 years, the term "Negro" was removed from the 2020 census, as a large portion of respondents advocated for its removal. Instead, the category shifted from "Black, African Am., or Negro" to "Black or African Am." on paper questionnaires and electronic instruments.

The identification of the term African American first occurred in the 2000 census, reflecting a long-standing history of offensive terminology since the censuses' inception. The 1790 census included other "free persons" by color and "slaves". From 1850 to 1880, the codes for enumerators were generally Black (B) and Mulatto (M). In 1900, there were no specified categories on the census listing form, and the instructions called for enumerators to list "B" for "Black (or negro or negro descent)", displaying the first occurrence of the controversial term "Negro". In 1930, there were specific instructions that used the term "Negro". Mixed persons were to be counted as "Negro" no matter how small the share of blood, also known as the one-drop rule. It was not until 1970 that the term Black appeared on a census form, and in 1990 the enumerator of color was eliminated.

The next change was reordering the example groups from "Argentinean, Colombian, Dominican, Nicaraguan, Salvadoran, Spaniard, and so on." to "Salvadoran, Dominican, Colombian, Guatemalan, Spaniard, Ecuadorian, etc." to reflect the ever-increasing geographic diversity of the Hispanic or Latino category and the variations in populations sums each year.

*Net coverage error is statistically significantly different from 0.

Though the issues of identification questions of origin were addressed, the accuracy of the 2020 census displays undercounts and overcounts of Black people, Latinos, and Native Americans according to the work conducted under Robert Santos, the current director of the United States Census Bureau. A follow-up survey concluded that the miscounting of children under five years of age and that American Indians and Alaska Natives living on reservations continued to have the highest net undercount rate, similar to 2010. One of the leading factors of the misrepresented information in the 2020 census is the coronavirus pandemic, which caused notable delays in the bureau's Post-Enumeration Survey. The Post-Enumeration Survey is used to determine how accurate the census results are and inform planning for the next national count in 2030. Furthermore, discrepancies persisted due to the irrefutable variables of delays to field work, migration of many college students and others, and some respondents failed to answer the necessary questions required for the Post-Enumeration survey to match the census.  American Journalist for the New York Times, attributes group quarters like college dormitories, long-term care facilities and prisons to have the largest contingencies in the tally as the pandemic pushed many university students to return home, making it harder to count them in the dormitories or apartments where they normally would have been.

Hispanic or Latino

Translating the data set, the 3.45 difference in net coverage error for the Hispanic or Latino category proves widely problematic, but is an avid reflection of the seismic shifts in the United States. Mexican immigrants have been at the center of one of the largest mass migrations in contemporary history, reaching a peak of 12.8 million in 2007, but have since declined, as reported by PEW Research Center. The predominant reasoning being shifts in political authority and the coronavirus pandemic resulting in policy changes. More specifically, immigrants entering through a permanent legal residency (green card), visa overstays, and apprehensions have drastically changed the input and output of data.

PEW Research Center also found that the number of immigrants who entered the U.S. in fiscal 2020 through a "green card" was down 45% from the prior year, most notably during the onset of the pandemic. Furthermore, the total number of non-immigrant visas processed in Mexico by the U.S. Department of State dropped 35% compared with the prior year, from about 1.5 million in 2019 to about 960,000 in 2020. The temporary visas were processed for tourism, business, or crossing the border. They did not include work authorization.

Consequently, due to political shifts, apprehensions of unauthorized Mexican immigrants increased considerably after the pandemic started in 2020. In fiscal 2020, the number of detainments of Mexican adults at the U.S.-Mexican border reached sky-high new levels under former president Donald Trump. There were 253,118 such encounters, up 52% from 166,458 the previous year. Now under president Joe Biden who has annulled record high immigration laws formulated under Donald Trump, the numbers of deportations and detainments is subject to change by the 2030 census.

Under the Biden administration, the number of people who received a green card declined from about 240,000 in the second quarter of the 2020 fiscal year to about 79,000 in the third quarter. However, Biden has proposed to provide a pathway for the undocumented immigrants in the United States to remain and gain legal status. Regarding refugees, the U.S. admitted only 11,411 refugees in fiscal year 2021 according to Pew Research Center. The low number of admissions appeared after the Biden administration raised the maximum number of refugees the nation could admit to 62,500 in fiscal 2021 and 125,000 for fiscal 2022.

Relation between ethnicity and race in census results

The Census Bureau warns that data on race in 2000 census are not directly comparable to those collected in previous censuses. Many residents of the United States consider race and ethnicity to be the same.

In the 2000 census, respondents were tallied in each of the race groups they reported. Consequently, the total of each racial category exceeds the total population because some people reported more than one race.

According to James P. Allen and Eugene Turner from California State University, Northridge, by some calculations in the 2000 census the largest part white biracial population is white/Native American and Alaskan Native, at 7,015,017, followed by white/black at 737,492, then white/Asian at 727,197, and finally white/Native Hawaiian and other Pacific Islander at 125,628.

The Census Bureau implemented a Census Quality Survey, gathering data from about 50,000 households to assess the reporting of race and Hispanic origin in the 2000 census with the purpose of creating a way to make comparisons between the 2000 census with previous census racial data.

In September 1997, during the process of revision of racial categories previously declared by OMB directive no. 15, the American Anthropological Association (AAA) recommended that OMB combine the "race" and "ethnicity" categories into one question to appear as "race/ethnicity" for the 2000 census. The Interagency Committee agreed, stating that "race" and "ethnicity" were not sufficiently defined and "that many respondents conceptualize 'race' and 'ethnicity' as one and the same underscor[ing] the need to consolidate these terms into one category, using a term that is more meaningful to the American people."

The AAA also stated,

The recommendations of the AAA were not adopted by the Census Bureau for the 2000, 2010 and 2020 censuses. This includes Hispanic, Latino, or Spanish origin, which remained an ethnicity, not a race. While race/ethnicity definitions for 2020 remained consistent, individuals who identify as White, Black/African American, and/or American Indian or Alaska Native was asked to specifically identify their racial origins.

Other agencies

In 2001, the National Institutes of Health adopted the new language to comply with the revisions to Directive 15, as did the Equal Employment Opportunity Commission of the United States Department of Labor in 2007.

See also
 Certificate of Degree of Indian Blood
 Classification of ethnicity in the United Kingdom
 Historical racial and ethnic demographics of the United States
 Judicial aspects of race in the United States
 Language Spoken at Home
 Race (human categorization)
 Race and ethnicity in censuses
 Race and ethnicity in the United States
 Racial segregation in the United States
 Visible minority

References

Further reading
 
 Prewitt, Kenneth. What Is Your Race? The Census and Our Flawed Efforts to Classify Americans (Princeton University Press; 2013) argues for dropping the race question from the census.
 

Demographics of the United States
Race in the United States
Ethnic groups in the United States
United States census